Adriana Maria Paniagua Cabrera (born 24 November 1995 in Chinandega, Nicaragua) is a Nicaraguan model and beauty pageant titleholder who won the Miss Nicaragua 2018 and competed at Miss Universe 2018 pageant.

Personal life
Paniagua lives in Chinandega, Nicaragua. She works as a model and has a license in Global management and finance.

Pageantry

Between 2011 and 2018 Paniagua won a number beauty pageants including Miss Teen Nicaragua, Miss Teen International, Miss Mundo Nicaragua and lastly, Miss Nicaragua 2018. In 2013, she withdrew at the Miss World 2013 contest in Indonesia, due to personal reasons. In 2018 she represented Chinandega at Miss Nicaragua 2018 and won the title. Paniagua also won a number of special awards including Best Hair, Best secret personality, Miss Eyewear, Best Face, Miss Digital Moviestar, Gold Candidate and Best Smile. She represented her country at the Miss Universe 2018 later this year, but did not place in the semifinals.

Politics 
Paniagua has been vocal in her support of the 2018 protests against President Daniel Ortega; writing "For a free Nicaragua, where there exists justice, liberty, and democracy" ("") in a June 2018 Instagram post. She has also been vocal in her support of freedom of expression and women's rights within the nation.

References

External links
missnicaragua.com
missuniverse.com
Adriana Paniagua

Living people
1995 births
Miss Nicaragua winners
Nicaraguan beauty pageant winners
Miss Universe 2018 contestants